Prasophyllum holzingeri is a species of orchid endemic to New South Wales. It has a single tubular, shiny dark green leaf and up to fifteen unscented, greenish to brownish pink and white flowers. It is only known from a few populations in the Barrington Tops area.

Description
The flowers are unscented, greenish to brownish pink. As with others in the genus, the flowers are inverted so that the labellum is above the column rather than below it. The edges of upturned part of the labellum are wavy and there is an oblong yellow or greenish yellow callus with a dark green base in the centre of the labellum and extending well past the bend. Flowering occurs between late January and early March.

Taxonomy and naming
Prasophyllum holzingeri was first formally described in 2018 by David Jones and Lachlan Copeland from a specimen collected in the Barrington Tops State Conservation Area and the description was published in Australian Orchid Review. The specific epithet (holzingeri) honours "William (Bill) Holzinger".

Distribution and habitat

References

holzingeri
Orchids of New South Wales
Endemic orchids of Australia
Plants described in 2018